Harpalus pumilus is a species of ground beetle in the subfamily Harpalinae. It was described by Sturm in 1818.

Synonyms:
 Harpalus vernalis (Duftschmid, 1812)

References

pumilus
Beetles described in 1818